Coreopsis bakeri, Baker's coreopsis or Baker's tickseed, is a flowering plant in the Coreopsis genus. It has yellow flowers. It is closely related to Coreopsis lanceolata. It is in the Asteraceae family.

It is found in Florida.

References

bakeri